Footloose was a Canadian band that had a hit in 1979 with "Leaving For Maui". The membership included Tim Feehan and later, Doug Riley.

Background
Formed in 1978 in Edmonton, Alberta, the group was made up of Tim Feehan on vocals, Dwayne Feland on drums, George Goodall on bass, Terry Medd on guitar and Curt Smith on keys. They all had a leaning towards the funky rhythm and blues sound. Dwayne Feland had played in the HUB Cigar band prior to his being with Footloose, and Tim Feehan and George Goodall had been in the funk-oriented dance band, Buckeye. Terry Medd had been playing in gigs with Curt Smith and he had also been in the band Missouri. 

The members of the band never had the intention of being a serious band. They were just trying to make some money. But their song "Leaving For Maui" got into the Canadian Top 10. It took them to Hawaii where they also played.

Career
The single, "Leaving For Maui" bw "Dancing Feelin'" was released in Canada on Mustard M-123 in 1979. It was released in the US on Hilltak PW 7905.

For the week ending September 8, 1979, the record was getting played on Keith James' show at CHED Edmonton, Rosalie Trombley's show at CKLW Windsor, and Don Stevens' show at CKLG Vancouver. By September 24th, it was also a chart at CKY Winnipeg.

By December 8th, Record World had it as "Single Pick". The reviewer mentioned the smooth pop vocals and classy arrangements and even compared them with an early Hall & Oates. The song eventually made the Canadian Top 10, staying in the charts for six weeks.

In 1981, Tim Feehan left the group to become a solo artist. He was replaced by Doug Riley. His solo album Sneak Preview was released on Mustard M 1004. Feehan would also do a duet with Canadian singer, Vicky Moss who he met in Hawaii while with the band.

Later years
The album was re-released by Cool Sound, Inc. on 10 December, 2001.
It was reissued again by Super Oldies in 2017. Containing work from 1979-1983, it included the album which was taken from the original master tapes. It also included four bonus tracks. Two on the bonus tracks, "Dream Come True" and "Caroline" were previously unreleased, featuring Doug Riley on vocals.

Discography

Further reading
 The Edmonton Journal, article - Nov. 5, 1979: Leaving for Maui an international hit (with video)
 Gigcity.ca, March 21, 2017 - HISTORY: From Hawaii to hockey to Hollywood
 Muuseo - Adult Contemporary Music, Tim Feehan, Footloose

References

External links
 
 Article at canadianbands.com

Hilltak Records artists
Canadian pop rock music groups
Musical groups established in 1978
Musical groups disestablished in 1984
Musical groups from Edmonton
1978 establishments in Alberta
1984 disestablishments in Canada